Thomas Walter may refer to:

Thomas Walter (botanist) (1740–1789), British-born American botanist
Thomas Ustick Walter (1804–1887), American architect
Tom Walter, American college baseball coach

See also

Tom Walters (disambiguation)